Markus Gander (born May 16, 1989) is an Italian professional ice hockey player. He is currently playing with Italian club, HCB South Tyrol of the Austrian Hockey League (EBEL).

Gander was named to the Italy national ice hockey team for competition at the 2014 IIHF World Championship.

References

External links

1989 births
Sportspeople from Sterzing
Germanophone Italian people
Living people
Bolzano HC players
Italian ice hockey right wingers
North Iowa Outlaws players
Wipptal Broncos players
Italian expatriate ice hockey people
Expatriate ice hockey players in the United States
Italian expatriate sportspeople in the United States
HC Pustertal Wölfe players
SG Cortina players